Thucca Terenbenthina, also known as Thugga, was an ancient Roman-Berber town in the province of African Proconsularis. In late antiquity, it was made a municipium of the province of Byzacena. Thucca Terenbenthina is identified with ruins located in the modern town of Dougga, Tunisia.

The town of Thucca Terenbenthina was also seat of the small but ancient bishopric of Diocese of Thucca Terenbenthina which remains a titular see of the Roman Catholic Church to this day.

References

Archaeological sites in Tunisia
Roman towns and cities in Tunisia
Ruins in Tunisia
Catholic titular sees in Africa
Ancient Berber cities
Roman towns and cities in Africa (Roman province)